Bob Morgan graduated from University of New Mexico and played in the Continental Football League with the Toronto Rifles from 1965–67 and five games with the Pittsburgh Steelers of the National Football League in 1967.

He joined the Toronto Argonauts for seven games in the 1969 season and after his release played for the Chicago Owls of the Continental league before returning to the CFL with the Ottawa Rough Riders in October 1969 for a game.

References

1940 births
Living people
Pittsburgh Steelers players
Toronto Argonauts players
Ottawa Rough Riders players
Canadian football running backs
People from Wamego, Kansas